Altzola is a railway station in Elgoibar, Basque Country, Spain. It is owned by Euskal Trenbide Sarea and operated by Euskotren. It lies on the Bilbao-San Sebastián line.

History 
The Elgoibar-Deba stretch in which the station is located opened in 1893, as part of the San Sebastián-Elgoibar railway. The station was damaged in 2014, when a small landslide destroyed the station shelter.

Services 
The station is served by Euskotren Trena line E1. Only four trains (in each direction) call at the station per day, with most trains on the line skipping it.

References 

Euskotren Trena stations
Railway stations in Gipuzkoa